Walter Lyle Bradley (July 31, 1943 – August 12, 2022) was a Canadian ice hockey centre. He played 6 games in the National Hockey League with the California Golden Seals and Cleveland Barons between 1974 and 1977: four games in 1974 with California, and two in 1977 with Cleveland. The rest of his career, which lasted from 1966 to 1978, was spent in various minor leagues. Prior to turning professional Bradley spent three seasons at the University of Denver. He died in Salt Lake City on August 12, 2022, at the age of 79.

Career statistics

Regular season and playoffs

Awards and honors

References

External links
 

1943 births
2022 deaths
California Golden Seals players
Canadian ice hockey centres
Cleveland Barons (NHL) players
Denver Pioneers men's ice hockey players
Denver Spurs (WHL) players
Des Moines Oak Leafs players
Estevan Bruins (SJHL) players
Houston Apollos players
Ice hockey people from Alberta
Portland Buckaroos players
Quebec Aces (AHL) players
Salt Lake Golden Eagles (CHL) players
Salt Lake Golden Eagles (WHL) players
Sportspeople from Lloydminster